The following is a list of indoor arenas in Sweden with a capacity of at least 4,000 at sporting events. The arenas in the table are ranked by capacity; the arenas with the highest capacities are listed first.

Current arenas

Under construction

References

See also
List of indoor arenas
List of indoor arenas in Canada
List of indoor arenas in the United Kingdom
List of indoor arenas in the United States
List of football stadiums in Sweden

Indoor arenas in Sweden
 
Sweden
Indoor arenas